Enyelbert Noriel Soto (born August 20, 1982 in Maracaibo, Venezuela) is a former professional baseball pitcher. Soto played for the Chunichi Dragons and Yokohama DeNA BayStars in Nippon Professional Baseball from 2011 to 2014. He played for the Gunma Diamond Pegasus in Japan's Baseball Challenge League in 2015 and 2016.

Soto played in the Houston Astros minor league system from 2004 to 2007.

External links

1982 births
Living people
Venezuelan expatriate baseball players in Japan
Nippon Professional Baseball pitchers
Chunichi Dragons players
Yokohama DeNA BayStars players
Greeneville Astros players
Tri-City ValleyCats players
Lexington Legends players
Salem Avalanche players
Corpus Christi Hooks players